Gilbert Auvergne (17 December 1905 – 24 September 1976) was a French sprinter. He competed in the men's 100 metres at the 1928 Summer Olympics.

References

External links
 

1905 births
1976 deaths
Athletes (track and field) at the 1928 Summer Olympics
French male sprinters
Olympic athletes of France
Sportspeople from Nice
20th-century French people